Anthony Pannier (born 7 September 1988 in Bruges, Gironde, France) is a French swimmer. At the 2012 Summer Olympics, he competed in the Men's 1500 metre freestyle, finishing in 20th place overall in the heats, failing to qualify for the final.

References

1988 births
Living people
Olympic swimmers of France
Swimmers at the 2012 Summer Olympics
French male freestyle swimmers
People from Bruges, Gironde
Sportspeople from Gironde